The 1975 National League was contested as the second division/tier of Speedway in the United Kingdom when British League Division Two was renamed. It was subsequently named the National League.

Summary
The league increased by one team for the fourth season in a row despite the loss of three teams; the Barrow Bombers, Long Eaton Archers and Sunderland Gladiators. The latter closed for good. Four new teams entered; the Newcastle Diamonds and Crayford Kestrels both returned for their first seasons since 1970, while Mildenhall Fen Tigers and Paisley Lions both competed in their inaugural seasons.

Birmingham Brummies, winners of the last British League Division Two, retained their title and were promoted to the British League for 1976. Birmingham won the league by 5 points despite losing their leading rider Phil Herne to Newport in division 1. Birmingham relied heavily on Arthur Browning, Alan Grahame and Keith White, improved performances by Ricky Day and Carl Askew and solid seasons once again from John Hart and George Major.

Newcastle finished runner-up on their return to league action, with the Owen brothers Joe Owen and Tom Owen topping the league averages.

Final table

National League Knockout Cup
The 1975 National League Knockout Cup was the eighth edition (first under its new name) of the Knockout Cup for tier two teams. Eastbourne Eagles were the winners of the competition.

First round

Second round

Quarter-finals

Semi-finals

Final
First leg

Second leg

Eastbourne were declared Knockout Cup Champions, winning on aggregate 83–72.

Leading final averages

Riders & final averages
Berwick

Dave Gifford 8.58
Graham Jones 7.65
Colin Farquharson 7.41
Steve Finch 6.75
Willie Templeton 6.34 
Denny Morter 4.89
Dave Trownson 4.86
Bernie Hornby 4.85 

Birmingham

Arthur Browning 9.35
Alan Grahame 8.38 
Keith White 8.22 
John Hart 8.00 
Keith Anderson 7.58 
Ricky Day 7.34 
George Major 7.31 
Carl Askew 6.91

Boston

Michael Lee 9.04
Bruce Forrester 8.22
David Gagen 7.83
Rob Hollingworth 7.30
Billy Burton 7.19
Les Glover 6.95
Dave Piddock 6.17
Rob Mouncer 6.13
Trevor Whiting 4.53

Bradford

Tony Featherstone 8.34 
Colin Meredith 7.92
Dave Baugh 7.42
Tony Boyle 7.11
Steve Wilcock 5.75
Andy Cowan 5.55
Alan Knapkin 5.48
Mick Fielding 4.49
Brenton Langlois 4.34
Dave Parkin 3.06
Barry Weaver 1.82

Canterbury

Les Rumsey 9.90 
Dave Gooderham 8.63 
Barney Kennett 8.23 
Graham Clifton 5.31
Bob Spelta 5.11
Jimmy Squibb 5.00
Gerald Purkiss 4.85
Terry Casserley 3.77

Coatbridge

Brian Collins 9.46
Mitch Shirra 8.37
Jimmy Gallacher 7.54 
Grahame Dawson 6.39 
Mick McKeon 5.64
Doug Templeton 4.94
John Wilson 4.73
Paul Heller 4.00
Eddie Argall 3.90
Derek Richardson 3.71
Barry Booth 1.68

Crayford

Laurie Etheridge 9.74 
Alan Sage 8.51
Trevor Barnwell 7.72
Pete Wigley 6.26 
Bob Young 5.86
Les Ott 5.78
Alan Johns 5.68
George Barclay 5.34
Dave Shepherd 4.92
Bill Archer 4.11

Crewe

Graham Drury 8.70 
Chris Turner 8.13
Nigel Wasley 7.75 
Chris Emery 6.3
Ricky Day 6.06
Stuart Cope 5.83
Les Collins 5.25
Max Brown 4.99
Geoff Ambrose 4.96
Cliff Anderson 4.90
Ian Robertson 3.27

Eastbourne

Paul Gachet 9.87
Neil Middleditch 9.62
Steve Weatherley 8.07
Pete Jarman 7.32 
Mike Sampson 7.28
Eric Dugard 5.49
Colin Richardson 5.24
Terry Barclay 3.78

Ellesmere Port

John Jackson 9.78
Colin Goad 7.13 
Wayne Hughes 6.76 
Nicky Allott 6.41
Duncan Meredith 5.78
Mick McKeon 4.86
Steve Casey 4.52
Gerald Smitherman 4.37
Barry Booth 4.00
Andy Reid 3.68

Mildenhall

Bob Coles 8.82 
Chris Julian 6.74
Stan Stevens 6.02
John Gibbons 5.93
Kevin Jolly 5.76
John McNeil 4.77
Paul Clipstone 3.59
Paul Gilbert 3.43
Fred Mills 2.97

Newcastle

Joe Owen 10.65 
Tom Owen 10.65 
Brian Havelock 6.72
Ron Henderson 5.81 
Mike Watkin 5.59
Robbie Blackadder 5.45
Tim Swales 5.23
Phil Micheledies 5.05

Paisley

Sid Sheldrick 8.00
Mike Fullerton 7.20
Alan Bridgett 7.12
Chris Roynon 6.00
Tom Davie 5.26
Bernie Foot 5.20
Stuart Mountford 4.47
Mick Sheldrick 4.00
Geoff Snider 4.00

Peterborough

Brian Clark 9.00
Russ Osborne 7.14
Roy Carter 6.67
Ken Matthews 6.66
Mike Cake 5.53
Jack Walker 4.70
Ian Clark 4.36
Roy Sizmore 4.33
Steve Taylor 3.52
Phil Cornwell 1.33

Rye House

Brian Foote 8.39
Hugh Saunders 7.46
Bob Cooper 6.75
Kelvin Mullarkey 6.25
Tiger Beech 5.69
John Gibbons 5.25
Bob Young 4.73
Dingle Brown 4.62
Karl Fiala 4.58
Barry Duke 4.33
Steve Clarke 3.87

Scunthorpe

Tony Childs 8.35
Keith Evans 7.52
Ken McKinlay 6.46
Andy Hines 5.99
Colin Cook 5.91
Tony Gillias 5.55
Andy Sims 5.38
Ray Watkins 4.24
Chris Emery 4.13
Ian Silk 2.09

Stoke

Alan Molyneux 10.14
Steve Bastable 8.04 
Steve Holden 7.92
Andy Cusworth 7.52
Jack Millen 6.96
Phil Bass 6.93
Jim Wells 6.55 
Mick Handley 6.09 
Alan Bridgett 4.62

Teesside
 
Tom Leadbitter 9.40
Doug Underwood 8.34
Alan Emerson 8.33 
Roger Wright 7.68
Dave Durham 6.05
Pete Reading 5.69 
Harry MacLean 5.25
Trevor Stead 3.44
David Levings 3.08
Colin Pestell 2.83
Ian Silk 2.29

Weymouth

Martin Yeates 8.31
Brian Woodward 7.77
Vic Harding 6.82
Chris Robins 5.15
Geoff Swindells 4.77
Nigel Couzens 4.73
Melvin Soffe 4.24
Tony Freegard 3.59
Ricky Owen 3.09
Roger Stratton 2.86

Workington

Lou Sansom 8.81 
Taffy Owen 8.37
Robbie Gardner 7.38
Kym Amundson 6.94
Mick Newton .6.63
Roger Wright 6.24
Terry Kelly 6.07
Steve Watson 4.42
Steve Lawson 3.64

See also
List of United Kingdom Speedway League Champions
Knockout Cup (speedway)

References

Speedway British League Division Two / National League